John George Knight (1826 – 10 January 1892), was an architect and Government Resident of the Northern Territory in  Australia.

Early life

Knight was born in London the son of John Knight, a stone and marble merchant. Knight became an engineer and for a time was superintendent of works for his father.

He arrived in Melbourne, Australia in February 1852 and after a week on the goldfields, joined the Public Works Department. Although earning a large salary, Knight did not stay long in the public service. On resigning he began to practise as an architect in partnership with a Mr Kemp. A third partner, Peter Kerr, was added to the firm, but Kemp soon afterwards returned to England.

The original design of Parliament House, Melbourne was entrusted to Knight and Kerr, and in 1856 the Legislative Assembly and Legislative Council chambers were built. Knight was the senior partner and there seems to have been a tradition that the design was really his. Thirty-five years later the writer of Knight's obituary notice in the South Australian Register who appeared to speak with knowledge said: "Parliament house ... is a monument to Mr Knight's artistic genius and his cleverness in planning its construction". In 1859 Knight with Captain Pasley reported on the estimated cost of completing the building with different kinds of stone, but after the completion of the parliamentary library building in 1860, nothing more was done for 17 years, when Knight had left Victoria. Peter Kerr was then appointed architect and prepared a new design for the west facade, and for the grand hall and vestibule which was adopted.

Knight ceased practising as an architect in or about the year 1860, and in 1861 organized an exhibition held in Melbourne of the Victorian exhibits for the London exhibition of 1862. Knight took these exhibits to London and arranged them most successfully. In 1866 he again arranged an exhibition in Melbourne of articles from Victoria which were sent to Paris for the exhibition of 1867, with Knight as secretary of the Victorian section. About this period he was also appointed a lecturer in civil engineering at the University of Melbourne.

Northern Territory

In 1873 Knight entered the service of the South Australian government and became secretary, accountant, architect, and supervisor of works, in the Northern Territory. He was subsequently chief warden of the goldfields, and filled a variety of other positions before becoming stipendiary magistrate, and finally in July 1890, government resident at Palmerston.

Knight died in bed at the administrators residence on Sunday evening, 10 January 1892, of a severe asthma attack, following a long illness of bronchitis and influenza. Knight was survived by three sons, two married daughters and his wife, who was then living in London. He was a man of much geniality of temper and great ability, with a special talent for organizing. To a friend who could not understand how a man of his ability could allow himself to be buried so long in a place like Palmerston, Knight replied that he liked the climate and enjoyed the life there. He appears to have been not merely a magistrate and administrator, but an arbitrator in all disputes, and a kind of uncrowned king of the Northern Territory.

See also
 Nightcliff

References

External links

1826 births
1892 deaths
English emigrants to Australia
19th-century Australian architects
People from the Northern Territory
Government Resident of the Northern Territory